The Australian Football League's 2010 finals series determined the top eight final positions of the 2010 AFL season. The series was scheduled to occur over four weekends in September 2010, culminating with the 114th AFL/VFL Grand Final at the Melbourne Cricket Ground on 25 September 2010. However, after Collingwood and St Kilda drew in the grand final, the series was extended to five weeks, ending on 2 October, with the first Grand Final replay since 1977 (and the last, due to rules changes in 2016). Collingwood won the replay by 56 points to become the 2010 premiers.

The finals system 

The system is a final eight system. This system is different from the McIntyre final eight system, which was previously used by the AFL
]].

The top four teams in the eight receive what is popularly known as the "double chance" when they play in week-one qualifying finals. This means that even if a top-four team loses in the first week, it still remains in the finals, playing a semi-final the next week against the winner of an elimination final. The bottom four of the eight play knock-out games, in that only the winners survive and move on to the next week. Home-state advantage goes to the team with the higher seed in the first two weeks, to the qualifying final winners in the third week. Games in Victoria are played at the MCG, regardless of the team's usual home ground, if a crowd larger than the seating capacity of Etihad Stadium (53,359) is expected.

In the second week, the winners of the qualifying finals receive a bye to the third week. The losers of the qualifying final plays the elimination finals winners in a semi-final. In the third week, the winners of the semi-finals from week two play the winners of the qualifying finals in the first week. The winners of those matches move on to the Grand Final at the MCG in Melbourne.

Qualification 

Summary of results

Week one

First qualifying final (Collingwood vs. Western Bulldogs)

Second qualifying final (Geelong vs. St Kilda)

First elimination final (Sydney vs. Carlton)

Second elimination final (Fremantle vs. Hawthorn)

Week two

First semi-final (Western Bulldogs vs. Sydney)

Second semi-final (Geelong vs. Fremantle)

Week three

First preliminary final (Collingwood vs. Geelong)

Second preliminary final (St Kilda vs. Western Bulldogs)

Weeks four and five

Grand final and replay (Collingwood vs. St Kilda) 
 Note: this article covers both the drawn grand final and the grand final replay

Scorecards

See also 
2010 AFL season

Notes and references

External links 

 AFL official website
 RealFooty by The Age (Melbourne) Online 
 SportsAustralia (news and views)

AFL Finals Series
Afl Finals Series, 2010